"Mutability" is a poem by Percy Bysshe Shelley which appeared in the 1816 collection Alastor, or The Spirit of Solitude: And Other Poems. Half of the poem is quoted in his wife Mary Shelley's novel Frankenstein;  or, The Modern Prometheus (1818) although his authorship is not acknowledged, while the 1816 poem by Leigh Hunt is acknowledged with the name of the author given. Only Percy Bysshe Shelley is not acknowledged as an author. There is also a prose version or further elaboration of the same themes of the poem in Frankenstein that immediately precedes the quotation of the poem. 

The eight lines from "Mutability" which are quoted in Frankenstein occur in Chapter 10 when Victor Frankenstein climbs Glacier Montanvert in the Swiss Alps and encounters the Creature. Frankenstein recites:

"We rest. – A dream has power to poison sleep;
We rise. – One wandering thought pollutes the day;
We feel, conceive or reason, laugh or weep;
Embrace fond woe, or cast our cares away:
It is the same! For, be it joy or sorrow,
The path of its departure still is free:
Man's yesterday may ne'er be like his morrow;
Nought may endure but Mutability."

The monster also quotes a line from the poem in Chapter 15 of Frankenstein, saying: "'The path of my departure was free;' and there was none to lament my annihilation."

Mutability (1816)

The poem first appeared in the 1816 collection Alastor, or The Spirit of Solitude: And Other Poems, published by Baldwin, Cradock, and Joy in London:

We are as clouds that veil the midnight moon;
How restlessly they speed, and gleam, and quiver,
Streaking the darkness radiantly!—yet soon
Night closes round, and they are lost forever:

Or like forgotten lyres, whose dissonant strings
Give various response to each varying blast,
To whose frail frame no second motion brings
One mood or modulation like the last.

We rest.—A dream has power to poison sleep;
We rise.—One wandering thought pollutes the day;
We feel, conceive or reason, laugh or weep;
Embrace fond woe, or cast our cares away:

It is the same!—For, be it joy or sorrow,
The path of its departure still is free:
Man's yesterday may ne'er be like his morrow;
Nought may endure but mutability!

Themes

The poem consists of four quatrains in abab iambic pentameter. A series of
symbols, clouds, wind harps, describe the permanence in impermanence. The themes of transformation and metamorphosis and the transitory and ephemeral nature of human life and the works of mankind were also addressed in "Ozymandias" (1818) and "The Cloud" (1820).

The first two stanzas concern the bustle and hurry of life which only conceals its inherent transience. Human lives are as vaporous as clouds or untuned lyres that, discarded, have become like an Aeolian harp that is susceptible to every passing wind gust.

The last two stanzas concern the theme of the lack of freedom. In sleep, the mind cannot control the unconscious which poisons sleep. Human life and actions are subject to uncontrollable internal or autonomic reactions and to external forces. The path of departure of sorrow or joy "still is free", that is, it is not under our control. The conclusion is that the only constant is change.

There is also a prose version of the themes of the poem also in Chapter 10 of Frankenstein before the appearance of the poem:

"Alas! Why does man boast of sensibilities superior to those apparent in the brute; it only renders them more necessary beings. If our impulses were confined to hunger, thirst, and desire, we might be nearly free; but now we are moved by every wind that blows and a chance word or scene that that word may convey to us."

The prose version enunciates the identical themes of the poem, that man cannot control his thoughts because man has a subconscious that he cannot completely control.

James Bieri described the poem: "The Alastor theme of loss is continued in 'Mutability,' with its lovely initial lines, 'We are as clouds that veil the midnight moon; / How restlessly they speed, and gleam, and quiver.'"

The theme of change and transformation was also the subject of the 1820 poem "The Cloud" published as part of the Prometheus Unbound collection.

Second poem (1821-1822)

An 1821-1822 poem by Shelley is also sometimes published under the title "Mutability". It is also published with its first line as title.

1
The flower that smiles today
Tomorrow dies;
All that we wish to stay,
Tempts and then flies.
What is this world's delight?
Lightning that mocks the night,
Brief even as bright.

2
Virtue, how frail it is!
Friendship how rare!
Love, how it sells poor bliss
For proud despair!
But we, though soon they fall,
Survive their joy and all
Which ours we call.

3
Whilst skies are blue and bright,
Whilst flowers are gay,
Whilst eyes that change ere night
Make glad the day,
Whilst yet the calm hours creep,
Dream thou – and from thy sleep
Then wake to weep.

Sources
Edmund Blunden, Shelley: A Life Story, Viking Press, 1947.
James Bieri, Percy Bysshe Shelley: A Biography, Johns Hopkins University Press, 2008, .
Altick, Richard D., The English Common Reader. Ohio: Ohio State University Press, 1998.
Cameron, Kenneth Neill. The Young Shelley: Genesis of a Radical. First Collier Books ed. New York: Collier Books, 1962, cop. 1950. 480 p.
Holmes, Richard. Shelley: The Pursuit. New York: E. P. Dutton, 1975.

References

External links
Online version of the 1816 poem read by Billy Collins on The Writer's Almanac with Garrison Keillor, August 4, 2013.
Online version of the 1824 poem on The Writer's Almanac with Garrison Keillor, March 31, 2001.
LibriVox audio-recording of "Mutability" by Percy Bysshe Shelley.
Composer Zach Heyde set the 1816 poem to music in a 2012 eponymous choral work.  https://zachheyde.bandcamp.com/track/mutability

Poetry by Percy Bysshe Shelley
1816 poems
Romanticism
Works by Percy Bysshe Shelley
1810s works